Dr. E. Marvin Allen Jr. (January 6, 1915 – September 13, 1996) was a former collegiate head soccer coach. He started the University of North Carolina soccer program in 1947, and became the program's first ever coach. From 1947 to 1976, he coached the North Carolina men's soccer program. He compiled a 174-81-23(.667) record in 30 years with the Tar Heels, boasting a 53-41-16(.555) mark in ACC play. He coached soccer coaching legend Anson Dorrance at UNC.

In 1962, he served as president of the National Soccer Coaches Association of America (NSCAA). He was inducted into the NSCAA Hall of Fame in 1988. He died in 1996, and was posthumously inducted into the North Carolina Soccer Hall of Fame.

Career 
Born in Wilmington, North Carolina. During his undergraduate years as a student Allen played on the University of North Carolina's club team against arch-rival Duke, to which he scored the clubs first ever goal on.

After completing his education, Allen then was the one who started the  University of North Carolina's Tar Heels soccer program from 1947 to 1976. Over his stint with the University, he had an overall record of 174 wins, 81 draws, and 23 loses. Not only this, during his time with the Tar Heels, he also coached many individuals to success including coaching legend Anson Dorrance. After coaching the team for almost 30 years, he finally retired in 1976.

His career with the team remains impressive to this day as he was the coach who led the team with a .667% win record and won a championship in the Southern Conference in 1948, co-champion in the Atlantic Coast Conference in 1968, and came in 2nd place in ACC play 9 times - to which they never placed lower than 4th in all their times playing.

Allen obtained a number of prestigious positions not only with the University of North Carolina, but also with the National Soccer Coaches Association of America (NSCAA). Not only did he become the first coach for the Tar Heels program in 1940, he also obtained a position as a Physical Education Instructor which then soon led him to become a professor in 1964. Allen then proceeded to hold Chairman positions with the College of Physical Education Association, Joint Committee for Physical Education for College Men and Women, NC Association for Health, Physical Education, and Recreation and Atlantic Coast Conference Soccer Committee. He also held the position of President with the NSCAA in 1962, along with being inducted into the NSCAA Hall of Fame in 1998.

After his death, Dr. E Marvin Allen Jr. was posthumously inducted into the North Carolina Soccer Hall of Fame in 1996.

Education + Life 
While also a player and a coach, Dr. Allen Jr. received a quality education from the University of North Carolina that proceeded to open up a number of doors for him. He graduated from the University of North Carolina with a Bachelors and a Masters and proceeded to  obtain a Doctorate from Pennsylvania State University in 1960.

Allen married to Helen Dugan from Washington D.C, to which they then had 2 children. Dr. E. Marvin Allen Jr. passed away on September 13, 1966 at the age of 81.

References
UNC Soccer Media Guide 2008
http://ncsoccerhalloffame.com/dr-marvin-allen
https://unc_ftp.sidearmsports.com/custompages/old_site/pdf/m-soccer/2002msocmg_history_31-59.pdf

1915 births
1996 deaths
North Carolina Tar Heels men's soccer coaches
Sportspeople from Wilmington, North Carolina
American soccer coaches
Soccer players from North Carolina
North Carolina Tar Heels men's soccer players
Pennsylvania State University alumni
Association footballers not categorized by position
Association football players not categorized by nationality